The A32 is a road in Hampshire, southern England, that links Gosport and Alton. Starting at Gosport, facing Portsmouth, it travels north via Fareham, Wickham, Droxford, before joining the A31 road near Alton.

Despite its non-primary status, the road forms the main access to the town of Gosport.  At rush-hour times, the road is often extremely congested (northbound in the morning rush, southbound in the evenings) as commuters head through central Fareham from the Gosport peninsula to the M27.  

During the evening rush, traffic can at times back up to the M27 at Junction 11 and along the inside lane of the motorway.

There have for many years been plans to provide a light rail solution to the traffic problem by utilising the former Gosport to Fareham railway line but this was scrapped in 2005. Part of the former railway line has since been converted for "Eclipse" bus rapid transit routes.

The A32 is a popular route for motorcyclists, particularly at weekends; the cafe ( now Loomies, formerly a "Little Chef") where the A272 crosses the A32 at West Meon has become central meeting place for many groups of riders. The historic site of Fort  to the south is easily accessed from Wickham and is a popular route for motorcyclists.

The A32 is referenced in a children's song.

External links

 SABRE page on the A32

References

Roads in England
Transport in Hampshire